Sven Kopp (born 17 February 1995) is a German footballer who plays as a defensive midfielder or centre back for SpVgg Weiden.

References

External links
 
 Sven Kopp at FuPa

1995 births
Living people
Association football defenders
German footballers
3. Liga players
SSV Jahn Regensburg players
SpVgg Bayreuth players
People from Weiden in der Oberpfalz
Sportspeople from the Upper Palatinate
Footballers from Bavaria